The Otway Baronetcy of Brighthelmstone in the County of Sussex, was a title in the Baronetage of the United Kingdom. It was created 30 September 1831 for Admiral Robert Otway, in honour of his service in the Napoleonic Wars and off the Brazilian Coast. As his two eldest sons had predeceased him in naval service, the baronetcy passed to his third son George Otway, the second Baronet, on his death in 1846. On George Otway's death the baronetcy passed to his brother Arthur Otway, the third Baronet, the fourth son of Admiral Robert Otway. Sir Arthur Otway was a barrister and politician and served under William Gladstone as Under-Secretary of State for Foreign Affairs between 1868 and 1871. He had no surviving male issue and the title became extinct on his death in 1912.

General Sir Loftus Otway was the younger brother of the first Baronet.

Otway baronets, of Brighthelmstone (1831)
Sir Robert Waller Otway, 1st Baronet (1772–1846)
Sir George Graham Otway, 2nd Baronet (1816–1881)
Sir Arthur John Otway, 3rd Baronet (1822–1912)

Sources
 

Extinct baronetcies in the Baronetage of the United Kingdom